The Chechidla Range is a mountain range in northernwestern British Columbia, Canada, located about  west of Dease Lake and 125–150 km south-southeast of Atlin. It has an area of 3236 km2 and lies roughly in between the Whiting and Sutlahine Rivers on the west and northwest and the Samotua and Sheslay on the east. It is a subrange of the Boundary Ranges which in turn form part of the Coast Mountains of the Pacific Cordillera mountain system.  The Whiting River has its source in the range.  The range's name is an approximation of a phrase in the Tahltan language meaning "mountains of small rocks".

See also
List of mountain ranges
Cheja Range

References

Boundary Ranges
Cassiar Country
Mountain ranges of British Columbia